William Henry Fitzbutler (1842–1901), also known as Henry Fitzbutler, was an American educator, doctor, medical school founder, newspaper editor, and civil rights leader. He was the first African American to graduate from University of Michigan's medical school in 1872. He founded Louisville National Medical College and helped establish Louisville Hospital.

Biography 
Fitzbutler was born on December 22, 1842 in Virginia, to a father who was enslaved. Their family escaped to Canada though the Underground Railroad, settling in Amherstburg, Essex County, Ontario. He apprenticed with Daniel Pearson, an African American doctor in Canada. He then studied at Adrian College and graduated from Detroit Medical School, followed by the University of Michigan Medical School. 

He moved to Louisville, Kentucky where he worked with his wife, Sarah Helen McCurdy (1847–1922), providing medical care. He also published the Ohio Falls Express newspaper. One of his six children was physician Mary Fitzbutler Waring, born as Mary R. Fitzbutler.

He died on December 28, 1901 in Louisville. The Fitzbutler House at the University of Michigan is named for him.

References

External links 
 

1842 births
1901 deaths
University of Michigan alumni
19th-century American physicians
20th-century American physicians
African-American physicians
Physicians from Louisville, Kentucky
People from Amherstburg, Ontario